Amel Dehby (born June 15, 1991) is a French professional kickboxer and winner of the World Kickboxing Network title.

In 2016, Dehby was defeated by Tiffany van Soest for the Glory Women's Bantamweight title.

She is the former two time WKN K1 World Champion and one time International Champion at Super Featherweight, the former ISKA K1 World Lightweight Champion, the former Nuit Des Champions Bantamweight Champion and the Urban Boxing United Tournament Champion.

Kickboxing career
Amel Dehby made her kickboxing debut in 2010 against Irina Mazepa, winning a unanimous decision.

In 2012 Dehby fought Bernise Alldis for the ISKA Lightweight World K1 title. Dehby won a unanimous decision.

In her next fight, Dehby fought for the WKN World Super Featherweight title. She won a unanimous decision.

In 2013 she participated in the Urban Boxing United four woman tournament. After Paola Cappucci in the semi finals, she won a unanimous decision against Maria Pantazi in the finals.

She participated in the Global Boxing Council eight woman tournament in 2015. Dehby defeated Lucie Mudrochova in semis and Stephanie Ielö Page in the finals to win the tournament.

In her next fight she won a unanimous decision against Veronica Vernocchi to win the WKN International Super Featherweight Title.

In 2016 Dehby participated in the Glory Super Bantamweight Grand Prix. She won a decision against Jiwaen Lee in the semi finals, during GLORY 35. During GLORY 36: Collision she won a decision against Isis Verbeek. In the finals she faced Tiffany van Soest. Dehby lost a unanimous decision.

Dehby was given a chance to fight Anissa Meksen for the Women's Bantamweight title during Glory 53. Dehby failed to capture the title, losing a unanimous decision.

Championships and accomplishments
World Kickboxing Network
WKN World K1 Super Featherweight Championship (Two time)
WKN International K1 Super Featherweight Championship
International Sport Karate Association
ISKA K1 World Lightweight Championship
Nuit Des Champions
NDC Bantamweight World Championship
Urban Boxing United
Urban Boxing United Tournament Champion
Global Boxing Council
World GBC Tour 8 Tournament Champion

Kickboxing record

|-  bgcolor=
|-  bgcolor="#FFBBBB"
| 8 February 2020|| Win||align=left| Stephanie Ielö Page || Empire Fight || Montbéliard, France || Decision (Split) || 3 || 3:00|| 
|-
|-  bgcolor=
|-  bgcolor="#CCFFCC"
| 14 September 2019|| Win||align=left| Kelly Danioko || Battle Of Saint-Raphael 7 || Saint-Raphaël, France || Decision (Unanimous) || 3 || 3:00|| 
|-
|-  bgcolor=
|-  bgcolor="#CCFFCC"
| 20 Jul 2019|| Win||align=left| Irem Akin || Le Choc Des Gladiateurs || Le Lavandou, France || Decision (Unanimous) || 3 || 3:00|| 
|-
|-  bgcolor="#FFBBBB"
| 18 May 2019|| Loss||align=left| Anaëlle Angerville || Master Fight || Chalon-sur-Saône, France || Decision (Unanimous) || 3 || 3:00|| 
|-
|-  bgcolor="#FFBBBB"
| 30 Mar 2019|| Loss||align=left| Naoil Tita || The Diamond 3 || Drancy, France || Decision (Unanimous) || 3 || 3:00|| 
|-
|-  bgcolor="#c5d2ea"
| 23 Feb 2019|| Draw||align=left| Anaëlle Angerville || Stars Night || Vitrolles, France || Decision (Unanimous) || 3 || 3:00|| 
|-
|-  bgcolor="#CCFFCC"
| 19 Jan 2019|| Win||align=left| Vittoria Di Mauro || Menton Boxing Stars || Menton, France || Decision (Unanimous) || 3 || 3:00|| 
|-
|-  bgcolor="#FFBBBB"
| 22 Sep 2018|| Loss||align=left| Jorina Baars || World Fighting League || Almere, Netherlands || KO || 3 || ? || 
|-
|-  bgcolor="#CCFFCC"
| 15 Sep 2018|| Win||align=left| Ruby Messu || Battle Of Saint-Raphael 6 || Saint-Raphaël, France || Decision (Unanimous) || 3 || 3:00 || 
|-
|-  bgcolor="#FFBBBB"
| 12 May 2018|| Loss||align=left| Anissa Meksen || Glory 53 || Lille, France || Decision (Unanimous) || 5 || 3:00 || 
|-
! style=background:white colspan=9 |
|-
|-  bgcolor="#CCFFCC"
| 17 Mar 2018|| Win||align=left| Ilona Wijmans || La Nuit Des Titans || Tours, France || Decision (Unanimous) || 3 || 3:00 || 
|-
|-  bgcolor="#CCFFCC"
| 13 Jan 2018|| Win||align=left| Lizzie Largillière || Nuit Des Gladiateurs 9 || Marseille, France || Decision (Unanimous) || 3 || 3:00 || 
|-
|-  bgcolor="#CCFFCC"
| 9 Sep 2017|| Win||align=left| Cathy McAleer || Battle Of Saint-Raphael || Saint-Raphaël, France || Decision (Unanimous) || 3 || 3:00 || 
|-
|-  bgcolor="#FFBBBB"
| 10 Dec 2016|| Loss||align=left| Tiffany van Soest || GLORY 36: Collision || Oberhausen, Germany || Decision (Unanimous) || 3 || 3:00 || 
|-
! style=background:white colspan=9 |
|-
|-  bgcolor="#CCFFCC"
| 10 Dec 2016|| Win||align=left| Isis Verbeek || GLORY 36: Collision || Oberhausen, Germany || Decision (Unanimous) || 3 || 3:00 || 
|-
! style=background:white colspan=9 |
|-
|-  bgcolor="#CCFFCC"
| 5 Nov 2016|| Win||align=left| Jiwaen Lee || GLORY 35 || Nice, France || Decision (Unanimous) || 3 || 3:00 || 
|-
! style=background:white colspan=9 |
|-
|-  bgcolor="#CCFFCC"
| 13 Feb 2016|| Win||align=left| Paola Cappucci || Stars Night || Vitrolles, France || Decision (Unanimous) || 3 || 3:00 || 
|-
|-  bgcolor="#CCFFCC"
| 12 Sep 2015|| Win||align=left| Veronica Vernocchi || Battle of Saint-Raphael 3 || Saint-Raphaël, France || Decision (Unanimous) || 5 || 3:00 || 
|-
! style=background:white colspan=9 |
|-
|-  bgcolor="#CCFFCC"
| 7 Feb 2015|| Win||align=left| Stephanie Ielö Page || World GBC Tour 8 || Pernes-les-Fontaines, France || Decision (Unanimous) || 3 || 3:00 || 
|-
! style=background:white colspan=9 |
|-
|-  bgcolor="#CCFFCC"
| 7 Feb 2015|| Win||align=left| Lucie Mudrochova || World GBC Tour 8 || Pernes-les-Fontaines, France || Decision (Unanimous) || 3 || 3:00 || 
|-
! style=background:white colspan=9 |
|-
|-  bgcolor="#CCFFCC"
| 4 Oct 2014|| Win||align=left| Marisa Pires ||WKN/GBC K1 || France || Decision (Unanimous) || 3 || 3:00 || 
|-
|-  bgcolor="#CCFFCC"
| 5 Jun 2013|| Win||align=left| Marta Branas || The Battle of Saint-Raphael || Saint-Raphaël, France || KO || 3 || 3:00 || 
|-
|-  bgcolor="#CCFFCC"
| 18 May 2013|| Win||align=left| Maria Pantazi || Urban Boxing United 2013 || Marseille, France || Decision (Unanimous) || 3 || 3:00 || 
|-
! style=background:white colspan=9 |
|-
|-  bgcolor="#CCFFCC"
| 18 May 2013|| Win||align=left| Paola Cappucci || Urban Boxing United 2013 || Marseille, France || Decision (Unanimous) || 3 || 3:00 || 
|-
! style=background:white colspan=9 |
|-
|-  bgcolor="#CCFFCC"
| 24 Nov 2012|| Win||align=left| Fatima Adib || Nuit des Champions 2012 || Marseille, France || Decision (Unanimous) || 3 || 3:00 || 
|-
|-  bgcolor="#CCFFCC"
| Nov 2012|| Win||align=left| Maria Pantazi || WKN World Title || St. Raphael, France || Decision (Unanimous) || 5 || 3:00 || 
|-
! style=background:white colspan=9 |
|-
|-  bgcolor="#CCFFCC"
| 19 May 2012|| Win||align=left| Bernise Alldis || Urban Boxing United 2012 || Marseille, France || Decision (Unanimous) || 5 || 3:00 || 
|-
! style=background:white colspan=9 |
|-
|-  bgcolor="#CCFFCC"
| 1 Oct 2011|| Win||align=left| Priscilia Marquez || F-1 World Max Tournament 2011 || Meyreuil, France || Decision (Unanimous) || 3 || 3:00 || 
|-
|-  bgcolor="#CCFFCC"
| 19 Jun 2011|| Win||align=left| Luisella Maccione || Grand Gala De Boxe || Grasse, France || Decision (Unanimous) || 3 || 3:00 || 
|-
|-  bgcolor="#CCFFCC"
| 2 Apr 2011|| Win||align=left| Houria Laalioui || 1/2 Finales Championnat De France Kick Boxing || Strasbourg, France || Decision (Unanimous) || 3 || 3:00 || 
|-
|-  bgcolor="#CCFFCC"
| 26 Feb 2011|| Win||align=left| Valérie Domergue || Championnat de France de Kick Boxing || Paris, France || Decision (Unanimous) || 3 || 3:00 || 
|-
|-  bgcolor="#CCFFCC"
| 16 Jul 2010|| Win||align=left| Irina Mazepa || All Stars || Saint-Raphaël, France || Decision (Unanimous) || 3 || 3:00 || 
|-
|-
| colspan=9 | Legend:

See also
List of female kickboxers

References

External links
 Amel Dehby at Awakening Fighters

1991 births
Female Muay Thai practitioners
French female kickboxers
Sportspeople from Nice
Glory kickboxers
French Muay Thai practitioners
Living people